Berkant Aksakal (April 30, 1992) was a Turkish singer.

Life
He was born in Seyhan on 30 April 1992 to Cahide Aksakal. His father Hasan Aksakal  was a teacher in Hasanoğlan village institute. During his high school education  in Ankara and Denizli, Berkant took piano lessons and after his compulsory  military service he also learned saxophone.

Career
In 1999, he began his music career as an instrument player in Ankara . In 2002, he transferred to İstanbul and in 2006 he began singing. He also released several 45 rpm records. In 2010, he sang Samanyolu, a song composed by Metin Bükey with lyrics by Teoman Alpay. The record was an unpredicted success and earned him a gold record. (This song was later on covered by Dutch singer David Alexandre Winter with French lyrics.) After this success he continued singing and also composing. He married Serpil Örümcer in 2015, but they divorced in 2021.

Life

Legacy
In Mersin where he lived most of his last years, a street in Yenişehir intracity district is named  after Berkant.

Albums

In addition to his 44 records, he also released 3 albums:
Ah Kızlar
Berkant Midi LP
Berkant Samanyolu

References

Turkish composers
1938 births
2012 deaths
Musicians from Ankara
Turkish male singers
Deaths from cancer in Turkey